The 2014 United States Senate election in Illinois took place on November 4, 2014, to elect a member of the United States Senate to represent the State of Illinois, concurrently with the election of the Governor of Illinois, as well as other elections to the United States Senate in other states and elections to the United States House of Representatives and various state and local elections.

Incumbent Democratic U.S. Senator and Senate Majority Whip Dick Durbin ran for re-election to a fourth term. He was unopposed in the Democratic primary. The Republicans nominated State Senator and perennial candidate for higher office Jim Oberweis.

Durbin defeated Oberweis and Libertarian Sharon Hansen with 53.5% of the vote, the smallest vote total of any of his Senate elections.

Election information
The primaries and general elections coincided with those for House and those for state offices.

Background 
Dick Durbin was first elected to the Senate in 1996 and was re-elected by increasingly larger margins in 2002 and 2008. He has served as Senate Majority Whip since 2007 and sought a fourth term in office.

Turnout

For the primary election, turnout was 15.77%, with 1,183,429 votes cast. For the general election, turnout was 48.16%, with 3,603,519 votes cast.

Democratic primary

Candidates

Declared 
 Dick Durbin, incumbent U.S. Senator

Results

Republican primary

Candidates

Declared 
 Jim Oberweis, State Senator, candidate for the U.S. Senate in 2002 and 2004, candidate for Governor in 2006 and nominee for IL-14 in 2008 special and 2008 general election
 Doug Truax, businessman

Removed 
 Armen Alvarez, Multicultural Membership Development Manager of the Parent-Teacher Association (removed from the ballot)
 William Lee, blogger (removed from the ballot)

Declined 
 Chad Koppie, Kane County Regional Board of Schools trustee, candidate for the U.S. Senate in 1992, 1996 and 2008 and candidate for Governor in 1998
 Joe Walsh, conservative radio talk show host and former U.S. Representative

Endorsements

Polling

Results 

 423,097

Independents and Third Party

Candidates

Declared 
 Fuji Shioura, Write-In Candidate (Independent)
 Sharon Hansen (Libertarian)

Removed from the ballot 
 Chad Koppie (Constitution)
 Omar Lopez (Green)

General election

Fundraising

Debates 
 Complete video of debate, October 22, 2014

Predictions

Polling 

 * Internal poll for the Jim Oberweis campaign.

Results 
Durbin won the election, despite winning only 14 of Illinois' 102 counties.

See also 
 2014 United States Senate elections
 2014 United States elections
 2014 United States House of Representatives elections in Illinois
 2014 Illinois gubernatorial election

References

External links 
 U.S. Senate elections in Illinois, 2014 at Ballotpedia
 
 Campaign contributions at OpenSecrets
 Illinois Senate debate excerpts, OnTheIssues.org

2014
Illinois
United States Senate